The United States Army Aviation Museum is an aviation museum located on Fort Rucker near Daleville, Alabama. It has the largest collection of helicopters held by a museum in the world. The museum features some 50 aircraft on public display with aviation artifacts ranging from a replica of the Wright brothers' Model B military biplane to an AH-64 Apache from Operation Desert Storm. The museum has over 160 aircraft in its collection and holds 3,000 historical items.

History
The museum broke ground on a new building called the Training Support Facility in November 2019.

Collection

On display

Other notable aircraft
 Sikorsky S-72 Rotor Systems Research Aircraft (RSRA)
 McDonnell XV-1 Convertiplane
 Ryan XV-5B Vertifan
 Hawker XV-6A Kestrel
 Ryan VZ-3RY Vertiplane
 YH-41A Seneca
 Curtiss-Wright VZ-7

Sources: US Army Aviation Museum collection pages

See also
List of aerospace museums
List of museums in Alabama
Southern Museum of Flight
National Museum of the United States Air Force
National Naval Aviation Museum

References

 Phillips, Cody R. A Guide to U.S. Army Museums, DIANE Publishing, 1992. .
 Purner, John. 101 Best Aviation Attractions. McGraw-Hill, 2004. .

External links

 
 US Army Aviation Museum page on IPMSSantaRosa.org

Aviation
Aerospace museums in Alabama
Museums in Dale County, Alabama
Military and war museums in Alabama
Helicopter museums